Princess Clementine von Metternich-Sándor Winneburg (27 June 1870 – 25 October 1963) was an Austrian aristocrat.

Early life
She was born in Paris on 27 June 1870 into the House of Metternich, ten days after the death of her grandfather. Her father was the Austrian diplomat Richard, 2nd Prince of Metternich-Winneburg zu Beilstein. Her mother was Countess Pauline Sándor de Szlavnicza, an Austro-Hungarian socialite. Her mother was the daughter of her father's half-sister, Princess Leontine von Metternich-Winneburg.  As a child she was badly injured after being attacked by a dog. She lived at Metternich Palace in Vienna.

Adult life
Princess Clementine, a favorite of the Hungarian composer Franz Liszt and a close friend of the famous coloratura soprano Adelina Patti, was the founder of the Catholic charities organization in prewar Austria and devoted her life to charitable activities.

As an adult, she adopted her grand nephew, Prince Franz Albrecht von Hohenlohe-Waldenburg-Schillingsfürst, who was the son of her niece, Princess Elisabeth von Oettingen-Oettingen und Oettingen-Spielberg, and Victor III, Duke of Ratibor. She abandoned the family estate in Hungary in 1947 and spent her last years with Prince Franz.

Metternich-Sándor, who never married, died on 25 October 1963 at Schloss Corvey in Germany. Prior to her death, Metternich-Sándor was the last surviving grandchild of Klemens, Prince of Metternich-Winneburg zu Beilstein, the Austrian statesman who organized the Congress of Vienna between November 1814 and June 1815.

References

1870 births
1963 deaths
Austrian princesses
Austrian Roman Catholics
Founders of charities
Dog attack victims
House of Metternich